The Hongkong Hotel was Hong Kong's first luxury hotel modelled after sumptuous London hotels. It opened on Queen's Road and Pedder Street in 1868, later expanding into the Victoria Harbour waterfront of Victoria City in 1893.

History
The original hotel stood roughly on the site of the present Central Building at Queen's Road Central and Pedder Street. It was owned by The Hongkong Hotel Company, which later became The Hongkong and Shanghai Hotels, Limited, current owner of The Peninsula Hotels chain.

In the late 1880s the six-storey north wing extension was built on the waterfront, with entrances on Pedder Street, Queen's Road and Praya Central (now Des Voeux Road Central). Competing in all respects with the Peak Hotel, owned by The Star Ferry Company, the management provided a special launch to meet arriving passengers on incoming P&O mail steamers and ferry them direct to the hotel's pier.

A shop of Kuhn & Komor was located on the ground floor of the hotel, along Queen's Road.

After the north wing burned down in 1929, the original part of the hotel, especially the large Gripps Restaurant, continued to be popular with the public, but the hotel eventually closed in 1952. The hotel building was bought by the owner of the 1949 Hong Kong Derby Champion and lead investor of a company which was later renamed Central Development Limited. Extensive renovation was done, but the part which once housed the popular Gripps Restaurant was torn down. In 1958, Central Building opened as a modern retail and office building, as it has remained at the present day.

The north wing
The six-storey north wing of the hotel facing the waterfront opened in 1893. It replaced the Melcher's Building, which itself was formerly owned by Dent & Co., where the west wing of its "princely hong" headquarters was located.

The north wing of the hotel burned down on New Year's Day, 1926 and in 1928 the site was acquired by Hong Kong Land and Gloucester Tower constructed in 1932. It was redeveloped into The Landmark in 1979.

See also

 List of lost buildings and structures in Hong Kong

References

Hotel buildings completed in 1868
History of Hong Kong
Defunct hotels in Hong Kong
Demolished buildings and structures in Hong Kong
Hotels established in 1866
Hotels disestablished in 1926
1866 establishments in Hong Kong
1926 disestablishments in Hong Kong
Demolished hotels
Defunct companies of Hong Kong